Paul Burgess may refer to:
Paul Burgess (musician) (born 1950), English musician
Paul Burgess (groundskeeper) (born 1978), English groundskeeper
Paul Burgess (athlete) (born 1979), Australian pole-vaulter
Paul Burgess (Ruefrex) (born 1959), academic, novelist and musician from Belfast, Northern Ireland